Kirkland Mission Church is an Anglican church in Kirkland, in Cumbria in northern England. It falls within the deanery of Calder and the diocese of Carlisle. Its benefice is Lamplugh, Kirkland and Ennerdale. The church is not a listed building.

References 

Church of England church buildings in Cumbria
Diocese of Carlisle